Mount Mary may refer to:

 Mount Mary, South Australia, a locality in Australia
 Mount Mary Church, Bandra, India
 Mount Mary College, Dimapur, Nagaland, India
 Mount Mary College of Education, a teachers college in Ghana
 Mount Mary University, Milwaukee, Wisconsin, United States

See also
 Mount Mary Austin, California
 Mary Mount (disambiguation)
 Marymount (disambiguation)
 Mount Marcy (disambiguation)
 Mount Maria (disambiguation)
 Mount Mercy (disambiguation)